Jeremy Lile is a former bass singer for the Southern Gospel quartet Brian Free and Assurance. He was with the group from 2008 to September 2015 when he had to resign his position due to health reasons. Jeremy was honored with the Singing News Fans Favourite Horizon Individual Award in 2008.

References

Jeremy Lile Departure from Brian Free and Assurance

External links 
 Brian Free & Assurance Homepage

Living people
American male singers
American gospel singers
Southern gospel performers
Year of birth missing (living people)